Léon Tellier was a French sailor, who represented his country at the 1900 Summer Olympics in Meulan, France. With Henri Monnot as helmsman and fellow crewmember Gaston Cailleux, Tellier took 3rd place in the first race of the 0 to 0.5 ton and finished 4th place in the second race.

Further reading

References

External links

French male sailors (sport)
Sailors at the 1900 Summer Olympics – 0 to .5 ton
Olympic sailors of France
Year of birth missing
Year of death missing
Olympic bronze medalists for France
Sailors at the 1900 Summer Olympics – Open class
Place of birth missing
Olympic medalists in sailing